Marco Haber (born 21 September 1971) is a German former professional footballer who played as a midfielder.

Playing career 
Born in Grünstadt, Haber joined 1. FC Kaiserslautern at age 18, and made his first division debut shortly after, on 14 October 1989, playing the entire 1–1 draw at Bayer 04 Leverkusen. In the following season, he became an automatic first-choice, leading the side to the national championship, adding the runner-up position in 1993–94. He also played as they won the 1991 DFB-Supercup.

In 1995, Haber moved to VfB Stuttgart, where he was regularly used during three seasons, also helping win the 1997 domestic cup. In August and December of the year he joined, he was called for the national team for two friendlies against Belgium (2–1) and South Africa (0–0). In his last season, he played in eight matches (seven complete) as Stuttgart lost the Cup Winners' Cup to Chelsea FC.

After an unassuming spell in Spain's second division with UD Las Palmas, Haber returned to his country and signed for SpVgg Unterhaching, being a regular fixture in his first two years. 2001–02 was split between Unterhaching and FC Hansa Rostock, appearing very rarely in his six-month spell, as relegation was narrowly avoided.

Subsequently, Haber spent five years in the Cypriot league, first in Omonia Nicosia, winning one championship and one Supercup, then Anorthosis Famagusta FC (league champion in 2004–05) and Nea Salamis FC. In summer 2007, he moved back to Germany, playing one season in the Regionalliga Süd (third level) with FSV Oggersheim.

Post-playing career
In the 2008–09 season, Haber was hired as sports director at FSV Oggersheim. He left the job at the end of the season.

After leaving FSV Oggersheim, Haber was appointed as new team coordinator at 1. FC Kaiserslautern.

References

External links
 
 
 
 

1971 births
Living people
People from Grünstadt
German footballers
Footballers from Rhineland-Palatinate
Association football midfielders
Germany international footballers
Germany under-21 international footballers
Bundesliga players
2. Bundesliga players
Segunda División players
Cypriot First Division players
1. FC Kaiserslautern II players
1. FC Kaiserslautern players
VfB Stuttgart players
SpVgg Unterhaching players
FC Hansa Rostock players
FSV Oggersheim players
UD Las Palmas players
AC Omonia players
Anorthosis Famagusta F.C. players
Nea Salamis Famagusta FC players
German expatriate footballers
German expatriate sportspeople in Spain
Expatriate footballers in Spain
German expatriate sportspeople in Cyprus
Expatriate footballers in Cyprus
West German footballers
VfR Frankenthal players